Kirsty McCabe (born 10 July 1975) is a Scottish weather forecaster and presenter at Sky News, and was formerly the senior meteorologist at The Weather Channel, based at the UK office in London.

Early life
Kirsty attended Annanhill Primary School and Grange Academy, while at high school McCabe was an early member of the Palace Youth Theatre which was a joint venture between Kilmarnock and Loudoun District Council and Borderline Theatre Company. During this time she played roles in many stage productions including Alice in Alice in Wonderland and performed as a solo singer on many occasions, notably performing John Lennon's "Imagine" in the 1993 production of Summertime Blues.

McCabe studied Geophysics at the University of Edinburgh, graduating with a first class honours degree before going on to spend three months as an intern at NASA's Goddard Space Flight Center in Maryland, where she used satellite magnetic data to interpret the underlying crustal structure of parts of Australasia. Further study at the University of Oxford saw her involved in a project to look for evidence of climate change in old volcanic soils on the Greek island of Santorini (Thera). While at Oxford she was elected President of the Jesus College Graduate Common Room. During her time at Oxford, she was offered a three-month internship at New Scientist magazine where she went on to work as a sub-editor for four years.

Career
McCabe joined the BBC Weather team in September 2003 and started her training on new media forecasts working on the BBC Digital's interactive service and online. She completed the first part of her forecaster training at the Met Office college in 2004 and her advanced forecaster exams in 2005. She then presented forecasts across a number of BBC outlets, including BBC News, Radio 4, BBC World News and BBC One. McCabe was a main weather presenter for BBC News at One and occasionally presented the weather on BBC Breakfast.

In January 2009, she replaced Andrea McLean as GMTV's weather forecaster. In September 2010, McCabe joined GMTV replacement programme Daybreak on ITV Breakfast as a weather presenter and environment correspondent alongside Lucy Verasamy. On 7 February 2012, it was announced McCabe had left Daybreak.

In June 2012, she joined South Today on BBC South as a weather forecaster for a six-month stint. In January 2013, she moved to Reporting Scotland on BBC Scotland.

From July 2013 to October 2016, she also presented weather forecasts for 5 News on Channel 5, providing cover for Sian Welby.

Since January 2015, she has presented weather forecasts for Sunrise on Sky News as well as working as a weather producer for Sky News.

McCabe was the senior meteorologist for The Weather Channel UK's office from January 2015 to May 2016, broadcasting via weather.com and the Weather Channel app.

In June 2017, she became the first meteorologist in residence for the London Marriott Hotel County Hall providing bespoke weather forecasts.

Personal life
McCabe married South African architect Renato Marchio in July 2008.

She gave birth to son Ethan on Christmas Day 2010, and to a second son Logan on 7 May 2013. Her third child Ava was born on Valentine's Day 2018.

References

External links
.
.

Living people
Scottish people of Irish descent
People from Kilmarnock
People educated at Grange Academy, Kilmarnock
Alumni of Jesus College, Oxford
Alumni of the University of Edinburgh
British geophysicists
Women geophysicists
Scottish meteorologists
BBC weather forecasters
GMTV presenters and reporters
ITV Breakfast presenters and reporters
ITV Weather
Women earth scientists
1975 births